The 1923 Sam Houston State Bearkats football team represented Sam Houston State Teachers College (now known as Sam Houston State University) as a member of the Texas Intercollegiate Athletic Association (TIAA) during the 1923 college football season. Led by first-year head coach J. W. Jones, the Bearkats compiled an overall record of 4–4 with a mark of 3–3 in conference play, and finished tied for seventh place in the TIAA.

Schedule

References

Sam Houston State
Sam Houston Bearkats football seasons
Sam Houston State Bearkats football